James Laughead (July 21, 1909 – 1978) was a photographer whose style defined the art of posed sports photography. He developed techniques for posing athletes to appear as if they were in action. He coined the term "huck 'n' buck" to describe the style. His photos appeared in Life and in Sports Illustrated.  His style was of posing players was often imitated, and influenced many of the sports photographers of his era.

References

External links
 

1909 births
1978 deaths
Place of birth missing
Sports photographers